David Jacks may refer to:
 David Jacks (footballer)
 David Jacks (businessman)

See also
 David Jack (disambiguation)